Bruce Broughton originally wrote the Tuba Concerto as a sonata for tuba and 24 orchestral winds in 1987. He later rewrote it for tuba and piano accompaniment. In 2003, Broughton reworked the sonata into a concerto so that it could be performed by a full orchestra. The tuba concerto was originally written for Tommy Johnson.

Instrumentation 
The concerto is scored for a solo tuba and an orchestra consisting of two flutes, piccolo, oboe, English horn, two clarinets in A, bass clarinet, two bassoons (second doubling on contrabassoon), two horns, two trumpets, three trombones (two tenors, one bass), harp, timpani, percussion and strings.

Structure 
The tuba concerto consists of three movements.
 Allegro moderato
 Aria (Andante moderato)
 Allegro leggiero

Media

Notable Performances 
Dennis Hale in 2010 with the North Oregon Coast Symphony conducted by Collin Heade.

See also 
 Bruce Broughton

References

Compositions by Bruce Broughton
1987 compositions
Broughton, Bruce